Hoplorana quadricristata is a species of beetle in the family Cerambycidae. It was described by Fairmaire in 1896. It is known from Madagascar.

References

Desmiphorini
Beetles described in 1896